Jessie Burns is a Canadian country music performer who originated from Alberta. She was nominated Female Vocalist of the Year at the Juno Awards of 1983, on the strength of her Nashville-produced album One Less Lonely Night (Churchill Records, CR-22005, distribution by MCA Records). However, her career did not continue past this recording.

Discography

Albums

Singles

References
 
 AMICUS No. 5036549.

Year of birth missing
Possibly living people
Musicians from Alberta
Canadian women country singers
Canadian women singers